Residenzstraße is a Berlin U-Bahn station located on the .
Opened in 1987 (Rümmler) this station was designed to resemble a palace, the Berliner Stadtschloss. With ornaments on the floor, pompous columns, mirrors and golden capitals this was accomplished (and very expensive). The motifs on the walls show plans of Berlin, the old Stadtschloss and parts of Berlin.

References 

U8 (Berlin U-Bahn) stations
Buildings and structures in Reinickendorf
Railway stations in Germany opened in 1987